Cephalodiscus dodecalophus is a sessile hemichordate belonging to the order Cephalodiscida.

It has erect tubaria.

References

dodecalophus